The 2013 Fukuoka International Women's Cup was a professional tennis tournament played on outdoor grass courts. It was the thirteenth edition of the tournament which was part of the 2013 ITF Women's Circuit, offering a total of $50,000 in prize money. It took place in Fukuoka, Japan, on 6–12 May 2013.

WTA entrants

Seeds 

 1 Rankings as of 29 April 2013

Other entrants 
The following players received wildcards into the singles main draw:
  Nao Hibino
  Yumi Miyazaki
  Riko Sawayanagi
  Akiko Yonemura

The following players received entry from the qualifying draw:
  Mana Ayukawa
  Eri Hozumi
  Akiko Omae
  Kaori Onishi

The following players received entry by a lucky loser spot:
  Haruka Kaji
  Miki Miyamura

Champions

Singles 

  Ons Jabeur def.  An-Sophie Mestach 7–6(7–2), 6–2

Doubles 

  Junri Namigata /  Erika Sema def.  Rika Fujiwara /  Akiko Omae 7–5, 3–6, [10–7]

External links 
 2013 Fukuoka International Women's Cup at ITFtennis.com
  

Fukuoka International Women's Cup
Fukuoka International Women's Cup
2013 in Japanese women's sport
2013 in Japanese tennis